Xiantao Subdistrict is a subdistrict in Yubei District, Chongqing, China. , it has 16 residential communities under its administration:
Jinyu Road Community
Baiguo Road Community
Guifu Road Community
Muxianhu Community
Zhouji Road Community
Tongsheng Road Community
Xianghe Road Community
Muling Road Community
Lanxin Community
Huashi Community
Huangshan Community
Konggangjiayuan Community
Shujugu Community
Heqing Road Community
Chunhua Community
Qiucheng Community

See also 
 List of township-level divisions of Chongqing

References 

Yubei District
Township-level divisions of Chongqing